Qabar Hoseyn (also Romanized as Qabar Ḩoseyn) is a village in Mangur-e Gharbi Rural District, in the Central District of Piranshahr County, West Azerbaijan Province, Iran. It had 572 residents, in 98 families, at the time of the 2006 Census.

References 

Populated places in Piranshahr County